James McMahon Graham (April 14, 1852 – October 23, 1945) was a United States representative from Illinois.

Born in Castleblayney, County Monaghan, Ireland, he immigrated to the United States and settled in Sangamon County, Illinois in 1868. He attended the University of Illinois at Urbana-Champaign and attended Valparaiso University; he was a teacher, lawyer in private practice, and in 1885-1886 a member of the Illinois House of Representatives. He was prosecuting attorney for Sangamon County from 1892 to 1896 and a member of the board of education of Springfield, Illinois from 1891 to 1894.

Graham was elected as a Democrat to the Sixty-first and to the two succeeding Congresses (March 4, 1909 – March 3, 1915); he was chairman of the Committee on Expenditures in the Department of the Interior (Sixty-second and Sixty-third Congresses). He was an unsuccessful candidate for reelection to the Sixty-fourth Congress in 1914. From 1916 to 1928, he was a member of the National Conference of Commissioners on Uniform State Laws and a member of the board of directors of Lincoln Library from 1936 to 1945. In the latter year, he died in Springfield; interment was in Calvary Cemetery, Springfield.

In 2010, a memorial plaque was unveiled in his honor at the Iontas Community Resource & Arts Centre in his native Castleblayney in Ireland.

References

1852 births
1945 deaths
Irish emigrants to the United States (before 1923)
Democratic Party members of the Illinois House of Representatives
Valparaiso University alumni
Politicians from Springfield, Illinois
Politicians from County Monaghan
Democratic Party members of the United States House of Representatives from Illinois
School board members in Illinois